Ivan Ranđelović (born 24 December 1974) is a Serbian former professional footballer who played as a goalkeeper.

Career
Ranđelović started out at his hometown side Radnički Niš, making his first-team debut in the 1992–93 season. He was the club's first-choice goalkeeper until 1996, before transferring to Spanish club Las Palmas. Over the following two years, Ranđelović managed to make only one Copa del Rey appearance, before returning to his homeland. He subsequently played for two Belgrade-based clubs, Zvezdara and Milicionar.

In June 2001, Ranđelović signed with Red Star Belgrade. He spent the following seven seasons with the club, winning three domestic league titles (2004, 2006, and 2007) and four national cups (2002, 2004, 2006, and 2007).

Honours
Red Star Belgrade
 Serbian SuperLiga: 2003–04, 2005–06, 2006–07
 Serbian Cup: 2001–02, 2003–04, 2005–06, 2006–07

References

External links
 
 
 

Association football goalkeepers
Expatriate footballers in Spain
First League of Serbia and Montenegro players
FK Milicionar players
FK Radnički Niš players
FK Zvezdara players
Red Star Belgrade footballers
Serbia and Montenegro expatriate footballers
Serbia and Montenegro expatriate sportspeople in Spain
Serbia and Montenegro footballers
Serbian footballers
Serbian SuperLiga players
Sportspeople from Niš
UD Las Palmas players
1974 births
Living people